Atrévete is a Venezuelan telenovela produced by Radio Caracas Television in 1986. It is based on the telenovela La señorita Elena written by Cuban writer Delia Fiallo.

Caridad Canelón and Pedro Lander starred as the protagonists.

Cast
Caridad Canelón as Mariela Román
Pedro Lander as Armando Morales
Dilia Waikarán as Carmela
Nancy González as Charo
Haydée Balza as Barbie
Laura Brey as Diana
Miguel Alcántara as Marco
Néstor Maldonado as Robertico
Elisa Stella as Doña Amanda
Rosario Prieto as Daría Sepúlveda
Alberto Álvarez
Belén Marrero
Nohely Arteaga
Julio Capote

References

External links

Opening credits

1986 telenovelas
RCTV telenovelas
Spanish-language telenovelas
Venezuelan telenovelas
1986 Venezuelan television series debuts
1986 Venezuelan television series endings
Television shows set in Venezuela